Maelstrom is a BBC television drama miniseries broadcast in 1985.

The six-part serial was written by Michael J. Bird, produced by Vere Lorrimer and directed by David Maloney. The major cast members included Tusse Silberg, David Beames, Trevor Baxter, Susan Gilmore, Edita Brychta, John Abineri, Christopher Scoular and Ann Todd. The production was filmed on location in the Ålesund area of Norway.

Maelstrom was essentially a thriller series, centering on a young woman who travels to Norway to claim an inheritance. She finds herself involved in the mysterious dealings of the family of her deceased benefactor—and that someone is out to kill her.

Credits

Main cast
Tusse Silberg as Catherine Durrell
David Beames as Anders Bjornson
Susan Gilmore as Anna Marie Jordahl
Christopher Scoular as Lars Nilsen
Edita Brychta as Ingrid Nilsen
Ann Todd as Astrid Linderman
John Abineri as Olav Tunheim
Trevor Baxter as Dr Albrigsten

Crew

Series written by: Michael J. Bird
Directed by: David Maloney
Produced by: Vere Lorrimer
Designed by: Bob Smart
Theme music composed by: Johnny Pearson

Episodes

DVD
Maelstrom was released on a 2-disc DVD in Norway on 28 March 2007 and in 2015 in the United Kingdom.

External links
 
 Michael J. Bird Tribute Site
 BBC Cult TV
 

BBC television dramas
1985 British television series debuts
1985 British television series endings
1980s British drama television series
1980s British television miniseries
English-language television shows
1980s British mystery television series
British thriller television series